Latinka may refer to:

 Belarusian Latin alphabet
Latinka, Kardzhali Province, Bulgaria
Latinka Perović  (1933-), Serbian historian